Lucheng Town is a town of Tongzhou District in the eastern suburbs of Beijing, located  east of Tiananmen Square. It borders Songzhuang Town to the north, Chaobai River to the east, Xiji and Zhangjiawan Towns to the south, Yongshun Town, Luyuan and Luyi Subdistricts to the west. As of 2020, it had a population of 69,288.

The name Lucheng was inherited from Lu County that was first established during the Eastern Han dynasty.

History

Administration divisions 
In the year 2021, the town was divided into 54 villages:

See also
List of township-level divisions of Beijing

References

Towns in Beijing
Tongzhou District, Beijing